Daniel Nii Adjei (born 17 June 1988) is a Ghanaian professional footballer who plays as a midfielder for Elmina Sharks FC. He is a former player of TP Mazembe, Wydad Athletic Club and Asante Kotoko S.C. and Kumasi King Faisal.

Club career

Asante Kotoko 
Between 2007 and 2012, Adjei played for Kumasi-based club Asante Kotoko. He rose become the captain of the side before departing in November 2012.

TP Mazembe 
Adjei played for TP Mazembe from November 2012 to 2017. He was a member of the team that participated in the 2015 FIFA Club World Cup after TP Mazembe had been crowned champions of Africa after winning the CAF Champions League in 2015. During this competition organized in Japan, he played in the match against Club América which ended in a 2–1 win. After playing for the Kinshasa club for 5 seasons, he left the club in December 2017, after his contract with the club expired.

Elmina Sharks 
In October 2020, Adjei signed for Ghana premier league team Elmina Sharks for a one-year contract ahead of the 2020–21 season.

International career 
Adjei has received two caps for the Ghana national football team, the Black Stars.

He played his first match on 13 October 2012, against Malawi, during the CAN 2013 qualifiers which ended in a 0–1 victory for Ghana. He played his second match on 1 September 2015 in a friendly match against Congo which also ended in a 2–1 victory.

Honours 
Asante Kotoko

 Ghana Premier League: 2008, 2011–12, 2012–13
 Ghana Super Cup: 2012
GFA Normalization Competition: 2019

TP Mazembe

 DR Congo Championship : 2013, 2013–14, 2015–16, 2016–17
 DR Congo Super Cup : 2013, 2014, 2016
 CAF Champions League : 2015
 Confederation Cup : 2016, 2017, runner up:2013
 CAF Super Cup : 2016, runner up : 2017

Wydad Athletic Club

 CAF Super Cup : 2018
Individual
 Ghana Premier League Player of the season: 2011–12

Notes and references

External links 
 

Wydad AC players
TP Mazembe players
Asante Kotoko S.C. players
Ghana international footballers
Ghanaian footballers
Ghana Premier League players
Association football midfielders
Living people
1988 births
Elmina Sharks F.C. players
Ghanaian expatriate footballers
Ghanaian expatriate sportspeople in Morocco
Ghanaian expatriate sportspeople in the Democratic Republic of the Congo
Expatriate footballers in the Democratic Republic of the Congo
Expatriate footballers in Morocco
Botola players
Linafoot players
King Faisal Babes FC players
People from Kumasi